Vatican Commandos were an American hardcore punk band formed in Darien, Connecticut.

The band features members James Spadaccini, John Farnsworth, Lindsey Anderson, Chip Moody, Chuck "Wheat" Weaver, and Richard Hall (who also went on to success under the name "Moby" after the VC had disbanded). The band was formed in 1982 and released its first 7" EP entitled, Hit Squad for God in 1983. Richard Hall (Moby) is credited as "M.H." on the back cover of the release. Later members included Dave Hower, Mike Pollock, and Matt Craig. The band went on to release the Just a Frisbee 7" EP later in 1983 and Point Me to the End 12" EP in 1984. The lineup for "Just a Frisbee," "Point me to the End," and the tour in between those two EPs was Chuck Wheat (Vocals), Dave Hower (Drums), Jim Spadaccini (Bass), and Mike Pollock, who replaced M.H. as guitarist.   The "Just a Frisbee" 7" cover artwork was drawn by Rob Zombie, founder and lead singer of White Zombie. The Vatican Commandos disbanded in 1985.

After 25 years, the band has reformed and played a reunion show July 17, 2010, at the Mercury Lounge in New York City with Up Front, Our Gang, Ed Gein's Car, and Loud Youth. The VC's played a West Coast reunion show on February 5, 2011, at The Dragonfly in Hollywood, CA with D.I.

Discography 
First Strike Compilation tape,  BCT(1983)
Hit Squad for God 7" EP (1983)
Just a Frisbee 7" EP (1983)
Point Me to the End 12" EP (1984)
Connecticut Fun Compilation LP (1985)
Make It Work Compilation 7" (1985)
Big City's One Big Crowd Compilation LP (1985)

References 

Hardcore punk groups from Connecticut
Musical groups disestablished in 1985
Musical groups reestablished in 2010
Moby
Musical groups established in 1982
1982 establishments in Connecticut

External Sources 
 80s Interview in "Desorden Social" zine; Tijuana, Mexico